Batocnema is a genus of moths in the family Sphingidae first described by Walter Rothschild and Karl Jordan in 1903.

Species
Batocnema africanus (Distand 1899)
Batocnema coquerelii (Boisduval 1875)

References

Ambulycini
Moth genera
Taxa named by Walter Rothschild
Taxa named by Karl Jordan